Resurrection lily may refer to:

Lycoris squamigera, a plant in the amaryllis family, Amaryllidaceae
Kaempferia galanga, a plant in the ginger family, Zingiberaceae